The Bilen (also variously transcribed as Blin, and also formerly known as the Bogo, Bogos or North Agaw) are a Cushitic ethnic group in the Eritrea. They are primarily concentrated in central Eritrea, in and around the city of Keren and further south toward Asmara, the nation's capital. They are split into three sub-tribes; Bet Tarqe, Bet Tawqe and Bab Jengeren which are split into further clans known as Hissat. The Tawke has six whereas the Tarke has five which each are divided into smaller kinship groups.

Origins
Tradition establishes an apparent connection between the Eritrean Bilen and the Ethiopian Agaw which can be seen in linguistic similarities between Agaw and Bilen. The presence of many identical place names in the areas around Lasta and Bogos in central Eritrea further alludes to some historical connection between the two groups. According to local oral tradition, the Bilen lived to the Eritrean plateau from Lasta around the 6th or 7th century when Queen Ben Hammawiya invaded the Lasta province from the North. They then also partially subdued the prior Tigre population. A second wave of migration may have occurred according to historians during the fall of the Zagwe dynasty in 1570. The Bilen first appear in historical records from the 6th century onwards. Some of The Bilen/Agaw ruled Eritrea and Ethiopia for 300 years.

Religion
The Bilen practice both Islam and Christianity. Muslim adherents mainly inhabit rural areas and have intermingled with the adjacent Tigre, while Christian Bilen tend to reside in urban areas and have intermingled with the Tigrinya People (Biher-Tigrinya). Sunni Islam is followed by half of the Bilen, with the other half adhering to Christianity of various denominations. The religious diversity of the Bilen has aided the peaceful coexistence among them with little conflict arising due to religious differences. The Bilen were originally Coptic Christians. In the mid to late 19th century during the Egyptian invasion of the Keren highlands (1860-1876) the Bet Tawqe clan accepted Islam, adopting the faith of their new overlords. The Bet Tarqe clan of the Bilen adopted Catholicism at the hands of French missionaries who offered to protect them from Beni-Amer raids in the area during the second half of the 19th century. There are a few mission-converted Protestants and few Bilen have retained their old Coptic Orthodox beliefs.

Economy 
The traditional livelihood of most Bilen consisted of pastoralism. However, the recent migration of other groups into the area resulted in the Bilens taking up other occupations including farming. Most modern Bilen are animal herders and farmers.

Language
The Bilen speak the Bilen language as a mother tongue, which belongs to the Cushitic branch of the Afro-Asiatic language family. Many also speak other Afro-Asiatic languages such as Tigre and Tigrinya. In addition, younger Bilen often employ Arabic words and expressions in their everyday speech.

Notes

Ethnic groups in Eritrea
Cushitic-speaking peoples